"Lies" is a song from American R&B/pop group En Vogue. It is the second single from their debut hit album, Born to Sing. Written and produced by Thomas McElroy and Denzil Foster, it became the group's second single to top the Billboard R&B singles chart. It peaked at number thirty-eight and was also their second US Billboard Hot 100 top 40 hit.

The song is led by Dawn Robinson and Cindy Herron with ad libs from Maxine Jones and Terry Ellis on the ending vamp.

Critical reception
Matthew Hocter from Albumism noted Robinson’s "incredible vocals coupled with the group’s brilliant interplay and that fresh new jill swing sound of the ‘90s." AllMusic editor Jose F. Promis stated that the song "proved that all members of the quartet were equally adept at handling lead vocals." Bill Coleman from Billboard wrote that it "continues to emphasize sparkling harmonizing, though swinging instrumental base grooves hard." He noted that it "sounds like another major hit."

David Giles from Music Week deemed it "a more commercial track", adding, "far much of the time it sounds like a Diana Ross record, until an almost angry rap cuts in towards the end." A reviewer from The Network Forty described it as a "sophomore" single. Edward Hill from The Plain Dealer noted that it "shuffles with the Soul II Soul technique." William Shaw from Smash Hits said the track has "a brilliant, wriggly funk rhythm made up of a great chunky mixture of parping sounds and chugging guitars and it's also got those trademark En Vogue warbling harmonies."

Music video
A black-and-white music video was produced to promote the single, directed by David Kellogg. It was later published on En Vogue's official YouTube channel in April 2015. The video has amassed more than 597,000 views as of October 2021.

Track listings and formats

 US 12"Vinyl Single
"Lies" (The Extended Avant Garde Remix) — 5:55
"Lies" (LP Mix) — 4:16
"Lies" (Extended Funky Remix) — 5:59
"Lies" (Kwame's Bonega Remix) — 4:40

 Germany CD Maxi-Single
"Lies" (The Avant Garde Funky Remix) — 4:15
"Lies" (Extended Funky Remix) — 5:59
"Lies" (The Extended Avant Garde Remix) — 5:42
"Lies" (LP Version) — 3:50

Charts

Weekly charts

Year-end charts

See also
R&B number-one hits of 1990 (USA)

References

1990 singles
1990 songs
Atlantic Records singles
Black-and-white music videos
En Vogue songs
Songs written by Denzil Foster
Songs written by Thomas McElroy